Ziad Abdelnour (Arabic: زياد عبد النور; born 3 December 1960) is a Lebanese-born American investment banker, financier, activist, and author of Start-Up Saboteurs and Economic Warfare. He is the president and CEO of Blackhawk Partners Inc, a New-York based private equity firm founded in 2008. He is the founder and president of the Financial Policy Council (FPC), founding member and partner of OMV Capital, and chairman of the U.S Committee for a Free Lebanon (USCFL).

In 2016, Ziad was named one of the 500 most influential CEOs in the world by Richtopia.

Early life 
Ziad Abdelnour was born on 3 December 1960, in Beirut, Lebanon. He is the son of Lebanese industrialist and former Member of parliament Khalil Abdelnour (1992–2000) and the nephew of the former financier and MP Salem Abdelnour (1960 – 1964 and 1972–1992). Abdelnour is the eldest child among five children. He took his early education in a private boarding school first in France and then in Switzerland. He graduated with a bachelor of science in Economics in 1982 from the American University of Beirut and received an MBA degree in finance from the Wharton School of Finance, University of Pennsylvania.

Career 
Since 1997 Abdelnour has been chairman and a founding member of the United States Committee for A Free Lebanon, an activist organization lobbying the United States government to oppose Syria’s influence in Lebanon and supporting the Syria Accountability Act. He supported the neoconservative Middle East Forum, co-authoring a Forum study whose signatories included later George W. Bush administration officials Paula Dobriansky and Douglas Feith. Abdelnour was co-chair of the Lebanon Study Group, which produced the report entitled Ending Syria's Occupation of Lebanon: The U.S. Role.

Following graduation in 1984 from the Wharton School, Abdelnour worked as an investment banker at Drexel Burnham Lambert where he was a Junk bond trader under Michael Milken. In 2008, after a 20-year career on Wall Street advising and investing in privately held companies, he founded his own investment company/private family office, Blackhawk Partners, Inc. engaged in the physical commodities trading and private equity businesses.

Abdelnour has spoken several times on T.V and has written on wealth creation, physical commodities trading, and Middle East Geopolitical analysis and has been a regular panelist and speaker on private equity and venture capital topics at industry conferences nationwide.

He is the author of 'Economic Warfare-Secrets of Wealth Creation', and ' Startup Saboteurs: How Incompetence, Ego, and Small Thinking Prevent True Wealth Creation'.

Abdelnour serves as chairman of the Board of Hawkstorm Global, an elite executive protection firm focusing on High Net Worth Personal Security Protection, Asset Protection, High-Intensity Conflict Intervention, Investigations, Security Consulting, and Crisis Management.

Abdelnour also serves on the advisory board of DPG Investments.

He is also one of the founding members and a partner of OMV Capital, an advisory and funding platform engaged in financing multimillion real estate and projects on a global basis.

Books 
 Economic Warfare: Secrets of Wealth Creation in the Age of Welfare Politics, John Wiley & Sons (24 January 2012), 
 Start-Up Saboteurs: How Incompetence, Ego, and Small Thinking Prevent True Wealth Creation, Morgan James Publishing (11 June 2020),

Awards and recognition 

 The Albert Nelson Marquis Lifetime Achievement Award, 2021 Marquis Who’s Who
 Named as one of the '500 most influential CEO in the world' by Richtopia in 2016.
 Awarded as a 'Global Shaper from the World Economic Forum' in 2017.
 Famous 300 American financiers in US history, 2016

References

External links 
 Official website
 Ziad Abdelnour at Financial Policy Council (FPC)
 Blackhawk Partners
 Hawkstorm Global

Living people
American chief executives
1960 births
Investment bankers
American investors